David Davis (14 February 1745 – 3 July 1827), known as "Castellhywel" or "Dafis Castellhywel" to differentiate him from others of the same name, was a Welsh minister and poet.

He was born at Goetre Farm in Llangybi, Cardiganshire, and educated at Carmarthen Academy.  He became a minister at Ciliau Aeron, where he married the local squire's daughter.  In about 1782 he moved to Castellhywel in the Cletwr valley, where he opened a school.

Works
Cri Carcharor dan farn Marwolaeth (1792)
Telyn Dewi (1824)

References

1745 births
1827 deaths
People from Ceredigion
Welsh-language poets